Tetracene, also called naphthacene, is a polycyclic aromatic hydrocarbon. It has the appearance of a pale orange powder. Tetracene is the four-ringed member of the series of acenes.
Tetracene is a molecular organic semiconductor, used in organic field-effect transistors (OFETs) and organic light-emitting diodes (OLEDs). In May 2007, researchers from two Japanese universities, Tohoku University in Sendai and Osaka University, reported an ambipolar light-emitting transistor made of a single tetracene crystal.  Ambipolar means that the electric charge is transported by both positively charged holes and negatively charged electrons.  Tetracene can be also used as a gain medium in dye lasers as a sensitiser in chemoluminescence.

Jan Hendrik Schön during his time at Bell Labs (1997–2002) claimed to have developed an electrically pumped laser based on tetracene. However, his results could not be reproduced, and this is considered to be a scientific fraud.

Napthacene is the main backbone component of the tetracycline class of antibiotics.

See also
 Tetraphene, also known as benz[a]anthracene
 Doxycycline

Notes 
Daniel Oberhaus, New Designs Could Boost Solar Cells Beyond Their Limits, Wired, July 11th 2019

References

Polycyclic aromatic hydrocarbons
Organic semiconductors
Laser gain media
Tetracyclic compounds
Acenes